Max Arthur Anderson (born June 6, 1945) is a former American collegiate and professional football running back and kick returner.  He played in the American Football League for the Buffalo Bills from 1968 through 1969.  He played college football at Arizona State University.

References

See also

List of American Football League players

1945 births
Living people
Players of American football from Stockton, California
American football running backs
American football return specialists
Arizona State Sun Devils football players
Buffalo Bills players
American Football League players